Solid State Ionics is a monthly peer-reviewed scientific journal published by Elsevier. Established in 1980, it covers all aspects of diffusion and mass transport in solids, with a particular focus on defects in solids, intercalation, corrosion, oxidation, sintering, and ion transport. The journal has an irregular publication frequency, having one or two releases per month, with additional conference proceedings; each release may be one issue, multiple issues or one volume. The editor-in-chief is Joachim Maier (Max Planck Institute for Solid State Research).

Abstracting and indexing 
The journal is abstracted and indexed in:

According to the Journal Citation Reports, the journal has a 2020 impact factor of 3.785.

References

External links 
 

Elsevier academic journals
Monthly journals
Publications established in 1980
English-language journals
Materials science journals